Renju opening pattern is a Renju position with 3 moves made. All debut classifications in Renju are based on patterns.

Restrictions on first moves
 The first move is black and must be played in the center of the board.
 The second move is white and must be played in the center 3x3 square.
 The third move is black and must be played in the center 5x5 square.

Openings classification
Since the second move is to be played in the center 3x3 square, the white stone must be adjacent (vertically, horizontally or diagonally) to the first move. It is clear that due to symmetry any legal opening pattern will fall into one of the following categories:
 Indirect openings - 2nd move is diagonally adjacent to the 1st move
 Direct openings - 2nd move is vertically adjacent to the 1st move

Indirect openings

Due to symmetry there are 13 possibilities for the 3rd move as shown on a picture.
1st move is solid black circle, 2nd move is white circle, possible openings are shown enumerated.
Brief evaluation for an old RIF opening rule follows.
1I (長星) (Chosei): mostly equal, slightly better for White
2I (峡月) (Kyogetsu): sure win for Black
3I (恒星) (Kosei): sure win for Black
4I (水月) (Suigetsu): sure win for Black
5I (流星) (Ryusei): slightly better for White
6I (雲月) (Ungetsu): sure win for Black
7I (浦月) (Hogetsu): sure win for Black
8I (嵐月) (Rangetsu): sure win for Black
9I (銀月) (Gingetsu): advantage for Black
10I (明星) (Myojo): sure win for Black
11I (斜月) (Shagetsu): slightly better for Black
12I (名月) (Meigetsu): advantage for Black
13I (彗星) (Suisei): sure win for White

Direct openings

Due to symmetry there are 13 possibilities for the 3rd move as shown on a picture.
1st move is solid black circle, 2nd move is white circle, possible openings are shown enumerated.
Brief evaluation for an old RIF opening rule follows.
1D (寒星) (Kansei): sure win for Black
2D (渓月) (Keigetsu): sure win for Black
3D (疎星) (Sosei): mostly equal, slightly better for White
4D (花月) (Kagetsu): sure win for Black
5D (残月) (Zangetsu): advantage for Black
6D (雨月) (Ugetsu): sure win for Black
7D (金星) (Kinsei): sure win for Black
8D (松月) (Shogetsu): slightly better for Black
9D (丘月) (Kyugetsu): slightly better for Black
10D (新月) (Shingetsu): advantage for Black
11D (瑞星) (Zuisei): mostly equal, slightly better for Black
12D (山月) (Sangetsu): advantage for Black
13D (遊星) (Yusei): sure win for White

External links
 http://renju.net/study/openings.php - brief evaluation of different opening patterns
 http://renju.net/study/starting.php - opening process description for the RIF opening rule

Renju opening rules